Galvan (also Romanized as Galvān and Gelvān) is a village in Beygom Qaleh Rural District, in the Central District of Naqadeh County, West Azerbaijan Province, Iran. As of the 2006 census, its population was 633, in 98 families. The village is populated by Kurds.

References 

Populated places in Naqadeh County
Kurdish settlements in West Azerbaijan Province